Mabote is a constituency and community council in the Maseru Municipality located in the Berea District of Lesotho. The population in 2006 was 38,047.

Marathoner Tsepo Mathibelle is a native of Mabote.

Although (ha)Mabote is located towards the west, the districts of Berea are highly territorial  and divide themselves mainly  the West side, naleli (NI) and qualabata (QlA)and the East side, khubetsoana (KTA)

KTA is the countries leading murder capital with more victims reported missing then dead KTA grew in reputation  as the land of the dead.

The streets of KTA are gruesome  and violent civilians are cautioned not to roam at late hours for the majority of KTA is seized by local gangs.

Villages
The community of Mabote includes the villages of:

Bochabela I (Khubetsoana)Bochabela II (Khubetsoana)BoinyatsoHa Rankhala (Khubetsoana)Ha Rasetimela (Naleli)Khutsong (Naleli)KuruoaneLecop (Khubetsoana)LifelekoanengLitupung (Maqalika)

Majara Section (Khubetsoana)Mapeleng (Ha Mabote)MaqalikaMasetlaokong (Khubetsoana)Matebeleng (Khubetsoana)MookoliMotlakaseng (Ha Mabote)Ngoana-Oa-Lla (Khubetsoana)Ntširele (Khubetsoana)Phahameng (Ha Mabote)

Phahameng (Khubetsoana) (Ha Mabote)Rural (Khubetsoana)SebabolengSekamanengSekoting (Khubetsoana)SelakhapaneTaung (Ha Mabote)Taung (Khubetsoana)Thoteng (Ha Mabote)

References

External links
 Google map of community villages

Populated places in Berea District